High Mountain is a mountain on the Bergen and Passaic county line, New Jersey. It is part of the Ramapo Mountains, and is not to be confused with the like-named High Mountain in the Preakness Range of the Watchung Mountains. High Mountain is partially within Ringwood State Park.

References

External links 
 Ringwood State Park

Mountains of Bergen County, New Jersey
Mountains of New Jersey
Ramapos